Halesite is a hamlet and census-designated place (CDP) in the Town of Huntington in Suffolk County, on the North Shore of Long Island, in New York, United States. The population was 2,498 at the 2010 census.

History
Halesite is named after Nathan Hale, a captain and spy in the Continental Army during the American Revolutionary War who arrived at Long Island at Huntington Harbor (at the site now named Halesite) just prior to his capture and execution. There is a rock with a tribute to him off the traffic circle at Mill Dam Road and New York Avenue.

From the mid-19th century until about the time of World War I, Halesite was served by a trolley line which brought passengers from Amityville through Downtown Huntington to the end of New York Avenue, at the northwest end of Halesite. Tourists were able to enjoy Halesite Park, which commands a view of Huntington Harbor.

Well-known persons who spent time or lived in Halesite include comedian/singer Fanny Brice, public servant and businessman George B. Cortelyou, and scientist Albert Einstein.

Geography

Demographics

As of the census of 2000, there were 2,582 people, 1,014 households, and 707 families residing in the CDP. The population density was 2,991.9 per square mile (1,159.2/km2). There were 1,049 housing units at an average density of 1,215.6/sq mi (471.0/km2). The racial makeup of the CDP was 95.27% White, 1.59% African American, 0.08% Native American, 0.93% Asian, 0.04% Pacific Islander, 0.77% from other races, and 1.32% from two or more races. Hispanic or Latino of any race were 3.10% of the population.

There were 1,014 households, out of which 29.7% had children under the age of 18 living with them, 60.1% were married couples living together, 7.0% had a female householder with no husband present, and 30.2% were non-families. 23.8% of all households were made up of individuals, and 7.6% had someone living alone who was 65 years of age or older. The average household size was 2.55 and the average family size was 3.03.

In the CDP, the population was spread out, with 21.2% under the age of 18, 5.7% from 18 to 24, 30.0% from 25 to 44, 30.0% from 45 to 64, and 13.1% who were 65 years of age or older. The median age was 41 years. For every 100 females, there were 98.2 males. For every 100 females age 18 and over, there were 94.5 males.

The median income for a household in the CDP was $96,972, and the median income for a family was $122,842. Males had a median income of $67,438 versus $52,632 for females. The per capita income for the CDP was $46,652. About 1.8% of families and 3.2% of the population were below the poverty line, including 2.4% of those under age 18 and 20.4% of those age 65 or over.

Institutions 
The area has been protected by the Halesite Fire Department since 1901. Halesite is also served by a United States Post Office branch, although its zip code is the same as that of the hamlet of Huntington (11743). Huntington Hospital sits along the southern boundary of Halesite.

Landmarks 
The East Shore Road Historic District is located within the hamlet.

References

Huntington, New York
Census-designated places in New York (state)
Hamlets in New York (state)
Census-designated places in Suffolk County, New York
Hamlets in Suffolk County, New York
Nathan Hale
Populated coastal places in New York (state)